William II (died 1226), Count of Perche and Bishop of Châlons, son of Rotrou IV, Count of Perche, and Matilda of Blois-Champagne, daughter of Theobald II, Count of Champagne, and Matilda of Carinthia, daughter of Engelbert, Duke of Carinthia.

William began his career as treasurer and provost of the Church of St. Martin of Tours, and was elected Bishop of Chalons in 1215, consecrated in 1216. The following year he succeeded his nephew Thomas, as Count of Perche, who was killed in the Battle of Lincoln. As count-bishop, William was a valuable advisor to the Kings of France and was listed among those by Pope Honorious III to participate in the Albigensian Crusade. His death in February 1226 would leave the question of the succession to the County of Perche unresolved for years. He left money to his cousin, Countess Isabelle of Chartres, for the "support of the poor".

References

Sources 

1226 deaths
Counts of Perche